

B.ED colleges

Nazir Ajmal Memorial College of Education, Hojai, Assam
Anunduram Baruah Academy B.Ed. College, Pathsala (Barpeta)
Asom Sikshak Prashiksan Mahavidyalaya, Lankeswar 
Ataur Rahman College of Education, Udmari Kalgachi (Barpeta)
Baihata Chariali B.Ed. College, Baihata Chariali (Kamrup)
Bajali Teacher's Training College, Pattacharkuchi, Barpeta.
Barnagar B.Ed. College, Sorbhog (Barpeta)
Barpeta B.T. College (Barpeta)
Biswanath College of Education, Chariali (Sonitpur)
Bongaigaon B.Ed. College, Bongaigaon
College of Education Boko Kamrup
College of Education, Guwahati (Kamrup)
College of Education, Morigaon
College of Education, Nagaon
Dr. Anita Baruah Sarmah College of Education, Guwahati (Kamrup)
Dakshin Guwahati B.Ed. College, Guwahati
Damdama B.Ed. College, Kulhati (Kamrup)
Deomornoi B.Ed. College, Deomornoi (Darrang)
Dhubri P.G.T.T. College, Jhagrarpar (Dhubri)
Dudhnoi Teachers Training College, Dudhnoi (Goalpara)
East Gauhati B.Ed. College, Guwahati
Faculty College of Education, North Gauhati (Kamrup)
Gossaigaon B.Ed. College, Gossaigaon (Kokrajhar)
Govt. B.T. College, Goalpara
Govt. Banikanta College of Teacher Education, Guwahati (Kamrup)
Govt. College of Teacher's Education, Kokrajhar (Kokrajhar)
Govt. College of Teacher's Education, Tezpur (Sonitpur)
Imperial College of Education, Dispur (Kamrup)
K.R.D. College of Education, Chhaygaon (Kamrup)
Kaliabor College of Education, Kuwaritol (Nagaon)
Krishna Bora B.Ed. College, Lanka ASSAM
Mangaldai Govt. Teachers' Training College, Mangaldai (Darrang)
Nalbari B.Ed. College, Nalbari
National Institute for Teacher Education, Khetri (Kamrup) 
P.G. College of Education, Tezpur (Sonitpur)
Pachim Nalbari B.Ed. College, Nalbari (Nalbari)
Pragjyotish B.Ed. College, Pacharia
R.C Saharia t.t college,tangla Udalguri
Rangia Teacher Training College, Rangia (Kamrup)
SDP College of Teacher Education, Tihu
Sikshan Mahavidyalaya, Nagaon
Sipajhar B.Ed. College, Sipajhar (Darrang
Teacher's training college, Mirza. 
West Guwahati College of Education, kotihati

Law colleges

Ajmal Law College, Hojai
Barpeta Law College Barpeta
Bongaigaon Law College, Bongaigaon
BRM Government Law College, Kamrup
Dhubri Law College
Dispur Law College
Goalpara Law College, Goalpara
J.B. Law College, Kamrup
Kokrajhar Law College
Mangaldai Law College, Darrang
Morigaon Law College, Morigaon
Nalbari Law College
NEF Law College
Nowgong Law College
Tezpur Law College
University Law College, GU

List of other colleges in alphabetical order

A
A.C.A. jr College, Missamari (Biswanath)
A.D.P. College, Nagaon (Nagaon)
Abhayapuri College, Abhayapuri (Bongaigaon)
Agia College, Agia (Goalpara)
Alamganj Rangamati College, Alamganj (Dhubri)
Alhaz Sunai Bibi Choudhury College, Lanka (Nagaon)
Amrit Chandra Thakuria Commerce College (Kamrup)
Anandaram Dhekial Phookan College, Nagaon. 
Arya Vidyapeeth College (Autonomous) Guwahati.

B
B.H.B. College, Sarupeta (Barpeta)
Bagadhar Brahma Kishan College, Jalahghat (Baksa)
Bimala Prasad Chaliha College, Nagarbera (Kamrup)
B. Borooah College, Guwahati (Kamrup)
Baihata Chariali B.Ed. College, Baihata Chariali (Kamrup)
Bajali College, Pathsala (Barpeta) (Now Bhattadev University, not an affiliated college)
Bamundi Mahavidyalaya, Bamundi (Kamrup)
Baosi Banikanta Kakoti College, Nagaon (Barpeta)
Bapujee College, Sarthebari (Barpeta)
Barama College, Barama (Baksa)
Barbhag College, Kalag (Nalbari)
Barkhetri College, Mukalmua (Nalbari)
Barnagar B.Ed. College, Sorbhog (Barpeta)
Barnagar College, Sorbhog (Barpeta)
Barpeta Bongaigaon College, Langla (Barpeta)
Barpeta College, Barpeta
Barpeta Girls' College, Barpeta
Barpeta Road Howli College, Howli (Barpeta)
Baska College, Baganpara (Baksa)
Basugaon College, Basugaon (Chirang)
Batadraba Sri Sri Sankardev College, Batadraba (Nagaon)
Behali Degree College, Borgang (Sonitpur) 
Beinstein College, Lokhora
Beltola College, Guwahati
Bengtol College, Bengtol (Chirang)
Bezara Anchalik College, Bezara (Kamrup)
Bhawanipur Anchalik College, Bhawanipur (Barpeta)
Bholanath College, Dhubri
Bhuragaon College, Bhuragaon (Morigaon)
Bijni College, Bijni (Chirang)
Bikali College, Dhupdhara (Goalpara)
Bilasipara College, Bilasipara (Dhubri)
Binandi Chandra Medhi College, Ramdia (Kamrup)
Birjhora Kanya Mahavidyalaya, Bongaigaon (Bongaigaon)
Birjhora Mahavidyalaya, Bongaigaon (Bongaigaon)
Biswanath College of Education, Chariali (Sonitpur)
Biswanath Commerce College, Biswanath (Sonitpur)
BMBB Commerce College, Guwahati
Bodofa U.N. Brahma College, Dotma (Kokrajhar)
Bongaigaon B.Ed. College, Bongaigaon
Bongaigaon College, Bongaigaon
Bajali Teacher's Training College, Pattacharkuchi, Barpeta.

C
Chaiduar College, Gohpur (Sonitpur)
Chhamaria Anchalik College, Chhamaria (Kamrup)
Chandrapur College, Chandrapur (Kamrup)
Charaibahi College, Charaibahi (Morigaon)
Chariduar College, Gohpur (Sonitpur)
Chatia College, Sootia (Sonitpur)
Chhaygaon College, Chhaygaon (Kamrup)
Chilarai College, Golakganj (Dhubri)
Chunari College (chunari)
College of Education, Boko (Kamrup)
College of Education, Guwahati (Kamrup)
College of Education, Morigaon
College of Education, Nagaon
Commerce College, Kokrajhar (Kokrajhar)

D
Dr. Anita Baruah Sarmah College of Education, Guwahati (Kamrup)
Dr. B. Borooah Cancer Institute
Dr. B. K. B. College, Puranigudam (Nagaon)
Dr. Birinchi Kumar Barooah College, Puranigudam (Nagaon)
Dakshin Guwahati B.Ed. College, Guwahati
Dakshin Kamrup College, Mirza (Kamrup)
Dakshin Kamrup Girls' College, Mirza (Kamrup)
Dakshin Nalbari Mahavidyalaya, Niz-Bahjani (Nalbari)
Dakshinpat College, Bhomoraguri (Nagaon)
Dalgoma Anchalik College, Matia (Goalpara)
Damdama B.Ed. College, Kulhati (Kamrup)
Damdama College, Kulhati (Kamrup)
Darrang College, Tezpur (Sonitpur)
Deomornoi B.Ed. College, Deomornoi (Darrang)
Deomornoi Degree College, Deomornoi (Darrang)
Dhamdhama Anchalik College, Dhamdhama (Nalbari)
Dharamtul College, Ahatguri (Morigaon))
Dharmasala College, Dharmasala (Dhubri)
Dhing College, Dhing (Nagaon)
Dhubri P.G.T.T. College, Jhagrarpar (Dhubri)
Dhubri Girls' College, Dhubri
Dimoria College, Khetri (Kamrup)
Dispur College, Guwahati (Kamrup)
Dispur Law College, Dispur
Dronacharjya College, Barpeta Road (Barpeta)
Dudhnoi College, Dudhnoi (Goalpara)
Dudhnoi Teachers Training College, Dudhnoi (Goalpara)
Duni Degree College (Darrang)

E
East Gauhati B.Ed. College, Guwahati (Kamrup)

F
F.A. Ahmed College, Goraimari, Tukrapara (Kamrup)
Faculty College of Education, North Gauhati (Kamrup)
Fakiragram College, Fakiragram (Kokrajhar)

G
G.L. Choudhury College, Barpeta Road (Barpeta)
Gauhati Commerce College, Guwahati (Kamrup)
Ghanakanta Baruah College, Morigaon (Morigaon)
Girls' College Kokrajhar, Kokrajhar (Kokrajhar)
Goalpara College, Goalpara (Goalpara)
Golden College (RATHNAPITH)
Goreswar College, Goreswar (Baksa)
Gossaigaon College, Gossaigaon (Kokrajhar)
Govt. B.T. College, Goalpara
Govt. K.K. Handique Sanskrit College, Guwahati (Kamrup)
Govt. Banikanta College of Teacher Education, Guwahati (Kamrup)
Govt. College of Teacher's Education (CTE), Tezpur (Sonitpur)
Govt. Shikshan Mahavidyalaya, Nagaon (Nagaon)
Guwahati College, Guwahati (Kamrup)
Gyanpeeth Degree College, Nikashi (Baksa)

H
Habraghat Mahavidyalaya, Krishnai (Goalpara)
Haji Ajmal Ali College (Nagaon)
Haji Anfor Ali College, Doboka (Nagaon)
Halakura College, Mahamayahat (Dhubri)
Hamidabad College, Jamadarhat  (Dhubri)
Handique Girls College, Guwahati
Harendra Citra College, Naligaon (Barpeta)
Hari Gayatri Das College, Guwahati (Kamrup)
Hatichong College, Hatichong (Nagaon)
Hatidhura College, Hatidhura (Dhubri)
Hatsingimari College, Hatsingimari, Dhubri
Hindustan College, Guwahati
Hojai College, Hojai (Nagaon)
Hojai Girls' College, Hojai (Nagaon)

I 
Icon Commerce College, Guwahati (Kamrup)
Imperia College of Education, Dispur (Kamrup)
Indira Gandhi College, Boitamari (Bongaigaon)
InfoEd College of Computer Education
Institute of Strategic Business Management (ISBM), Guwahati (Kamrup)

J
Jettwings Business School, Guwahati (Kamrup Urban)
Jettwings Institute Of Fashion, Design & Architecture, Guwahati (Kamrup Urban)
Jagiroad College, Jagiroad (Morigaon)
Jaleswar College, Tapoban (Goalpara)
Jamduar College, Saraibil (Kokrajhar)
Jamunamukh College, Jamunamukh (Nagaon)
Janapriya College, Garemari (Barpeta)
Janata College, (Serfanguri), Kokrajhar
Jawaharlal Nehru College, Boko (Kamrup)
Juria College, Fakuli Pathar (Nagaon)

K
K.C. Das Commerce College, Guwahati (Kamrup)
K.R.B. Girls' College, Guwahati
K.R.D. College of Education, Chhaygaon (Kamrup)
Kalabari College, Kalabari (Sonitpur)
Kalaguru Bishnu Rabha Degree College, Orang (Udalguri)
Kaliabor College of Education, Kuwaritol (Nagaon)
Kamrup College, Chamata (Nalbari)
Kampur College, Kampur (Nagaon)
Kanpai Bordoloi College, Borchila (Morigaon)
Kanya Mahavidyalaya, Guwahati
Karmashree Hiteswar Saikia College, Guwahati
Katahguri College, Tuktuki (Nagaon)
Kayakuchi College, Kayakuchi (Barpeta)
Khagarijan College, Chotahaibar (Nagaon)
Kharupetia College, Kharupetia (Darrang)
Khetri Dharmapur College, Bari (Nalbari)
Khoirabari College, Khoirabari (Udalguri)
Kokrajhar Government College, Kokrajhar (Kokrajhar)
Kokrajhar Music and Fine Arts College, Kokrajhar
Krishna Bora B.Ed. College, Lanka
Krishanaguru Mahavidyalaya, Nasatra (Barpeta)

L
L.C. Bharali College, Guwahati
L.G.B. Girls' College, Tezpur (Sonitpur)
Lokopriya Gopinath Bordoloi Regional Institute of Mental Health
Lachit Barphookan Commerce Academy, Morikalong (Nagaon)
Lakhipur College, Lakhipur (Goalpara)
Lalit Chandra Bharali College, Guwahati
Lanka Mahavidyalaya, Lanka (Nagaon)
Lokanayak Omeo Kumar Das College, Dhekiajuli (Sonitpur)
Luitparia College, Kalairdia (Barpeta)
Lumding College, Lumding (Nagaon)

M
M.C. College, Barpeta (Barpeta)
M.N.C. Balika Mahavidyalaya, Nalbari
Madhab Choudhury College, Barpeta
Madhya Kamrup College, Subha, Chenga (Barpeta)
Madhya Kampeeth College, Borka, Pub-Borka (Kamrup)
Manabendra Sarma Girls' College, Rangia (Kamrup)
Mankachar College, Mankachar (Dhubri)
Mandia Anchalik College, Mandia (Barpeta)
Mangaldai Govt. Teachers' Training College, Mangaldai (Darrang)
Mangaldai College, Mangaldai (Darrang)
Mangaldai Commerce College, Mangaldai (Darrang)
Mangaldai Degree Girls College, Magnaldai (Darrang)
Mahatma Gandhi College, Chalantapara (Bongaigaon)
Majbat College, Majbat (Udalguri)
Manikpur Anchalik College, Manikpur (Bongaigaon)
Mayang Anchalik College, Raja-Mayang (Morigaon)
Mazbat College, Mazbat (Darrang)
Milanjyoti College, Itervita (Barpeta)
Missamari College, Missamari (Sonitpur)
Moirabari College, Moirabari (Morigaon)
Morigaon College, Morigaon (Morigaon)
Murazar College, Murazar (Nagaon)
Mushalpur College, Mushalpur, (Baksa)

N
Nagaon G. N. D. G. Commerce College, Panigaon (Nagaon)
Nabajyoti College, Kalgachia (Barpeta)
Nalbari B.Ed. College, Nalbari
Nalbari College, Nalbari
Nalbari Commerce College, Nalbari
Nalbari Sanskrit College, Nalbari (Nalbari)
Narangi Anchalik Mahavidyalaya, Guwahati (Kamrup)
National Institute for Teacher Education, Khetri (Kamrup)
Navasakti College, Majgoan (Barpeta)
Nirmal Haloi College, Patacharkuchi (Barpeta)
Nonoi College, Nonoi (Nagaon)
North Gauhati College, Guwahati
North Kamrup College, Baghmara (Barpeta)
Nowgong College, Nagaon
Nowgong Girls' College, Nagaon

P
•  Pandit Deendayal Upadhaya Adarsha Mahavidyalaya, Amjonga Goalpara
P.G. College of Education, Tezpur (Sonitpur)
Pandu College, maligaon
Paschim Guwahati Mahavidyalaya, Guwahati
Paschim Barigog Anchalik Mahavidyalaya, Baranghati (Kamrup)
Pachim Nalbari B.Ed. College, Nalbari (Nalbari)
Patidarrang College, Loch (Kamrup)
Pragjyotish B.Ed. College, Pacharia
Pragjyotish College, Guwahati
Pramathesh Barua College, Gauripur (Dhubri)
Province College, Ganeshguri
Progati College, Agomani (Dhubri)
Pub-Bongsor College, Pacharia
Pub Kamrup College, Baihata Chariali (Kamrup)
Puthimari College, Soneswar (Kamrup)
Pune Institute Of Business Management, Guwahati campus (Kamrup)

R
Radha Govinda Baruah College, Guwahati
Raha College, Ranha (Nagaon)
Rajiv Gandhi Memorial College, Lengtisinga (Bongaigaon)
Rampur Anchalik College, Rampur (Kamrup)
Rangapara College, Rangapara (Sonitpur)
Rangia College, Rangia (Kamrup)
Rangia Teacher Training College, Rangia (Kamrup)
Ratnapith College, Chapar (Dhubri)
Rupahi College, Rupahi (Nagaon)

S
Salbari College, Salbari (Baksa)
Samaguri College, Samaguri (Nagaon)
Sapatgram College, Sapatgram (Dhubri)
Saraighat College, Changsari (Kamrup)
Science College, Kokrajhar (Kokrajhar)
Sikshan Mahavidyalaya, Nagaon
Sipajhar B.Ed. College, Sipajhar (Darrang)
Sipajhar College, Sipajhar (Darrang)
Sonapur College, Sonapur (Kamrup)
Sontali Anchalik College, Mahatoli (Kamrup)
South Salmara College, South Salmara (Dhubri)
Srimanta Sankar Madhab Mahavidyalay, Bhatkuchi (Barpeta)
State College of Music, Guwahati
Sualkuchi Budram Madhab Satradhikar College, Sualkuchi (Kamrup)
 Sukuram Bharali Commerce & Management College, Khetri (Kamrup)
Suren Das College, Hajo (Kamrup)
Swami Yogananda Giri College, Saktiashram (Kokrajhar)
Swadeshi College of Commerce, Guwahati
SDP College of Teacher Education, Tihu

T
T.H.B. College, Jamugurihat (Sonitpur)
Tamulpur College, Tamulpur (Baksa)
Tangla College, Tangla (Udalguri)
Tezpur College, Tezpur (Sonitpur)
Thamna Anchalik Degree College, Thamna (Baksa)
Tihu College, Tihu (Nalbari)
Tupamari anchalik college, Tupamari (Kamrup)

U
U.N. Brahma College, Kajalgaon, (Chirang)
Udalguri College, Udalguri (Udalguri)
Udali College, Bamungaon (Nagaon)
Uttar Barpeta College, Sankuchi (Barpeta)
Uttar Kampith Mahavidyalaya, Jagara (Nalbari)

V
Vidya Bharati College, Kendua (Kamrup)

W
West Gauhati Commerce College, Guwahati (Maligaon)
West Goalpara College, Ambari, PO Balarbhita, Dist. Goalpara, 783129

References 

 GU Official Webpage
 GU Affiliated Colleges Webpage

Affiliates
Gauhati University
Gauhati
 
Gauhati University